Dennis the Menace Strikes Again (also known as: Dennis 2: Dennis Strikes Again) is a 1998 American comedy film. It is the sequel to the 1993 theatrical feature Dennis the Menace and stars Don Rickles, Betty White, and Justin Cooper. It was produced by Outlaw Productions and released by Warner Home Video on July 14, 1998. 

None of the cast from the first film returned to reprise their roles, with all of them being recast. Additionally, this was Don Rickles' final live action film performance.

Plot
Two and a half years after the first film, Dennis Mitchell (Justin Cooper) is worse than ever. At the beginning of the film, he goes over to the Wilsons' house to offer George (Don Rickles) some pets as gifts for his birthday. They include frogs, lizards, snakes, insects, tarantulas, scorpions, mice, exotic mammals, and even a baby alligator. This ordeal ends with George unintentionally riding down a flight of stairs in Dennis' red wagon and accidentally getting his birthday cake thrown on his face by his wife, Martha (Betty White).

Soon after this incident, Mr. Johnson, Dennis' grandfather, Alice's father, and Henry's father-in law (George Kennedy), shows up and announces that he is moving in with them. Dennis starts spending more time with him than George.

George, upset that he's getting older, gets tricked by two crooked con men, the Professor and his assistant, Sylvester (Brian Doyle-Murray and Carrot Top), who try to talk him into buying a "rare" root used to make tea to make people younger. He is about to pay them $10,000 when Dennis comes by. Dennis then reveals that he owns one of the same kind, which he says he found on a place where those abound.

Soon afterward, the Professor and Sylvester return and sell George a machine that allegedly makes people younger. Suddenly, the attitudes of him and Mr. Johnson reverse as the latter feels the former's pain of living in the same neighborhood as Dennis, while he starts to feel youthful and happy. While Dennis is trying to clean up a pile of garbage that he accidentally threw on Mr. Johnson's car while taking out the trash, he accidentally destroys George's machine with cotton candy mix that he mistook for soap. As a result of this, George declares that he and Martha will be moving to be away from Dennis for good, whereupon Mr. Johnson decides to move into their house, although no one seems to really want to carry out this plan.

Overhearing everything, the Professor and Sylvester decide to use George's plan as an opportunity to get more money from him. Dennis helps the police (unintentionally) catch them (as they pretended to be several different workmen at the Wilsons' house when they were planning to move, attempting yet again to drain his bank account by stockpiling a hoard of his as yet uncashed checks by claiming that the house needed several repairs before it could be sold).

The police return the uncashed checks, and George decides not to move after Dennis begs him not to do so. Mr. Johnson, however, announces intentions to get his camper back, having promised to take Dennis to the Grand Canyon, also because of everything he has put him through.

The film ends as Dennis and Mr. Johnson are in his camper in the Grand Canyon and Dennis, wanting to take a rock home to George as a present, accidentally takes the one from under the camper, causing it to roll down the incline it is parked on top of with Mr. Johnson still inside. While enjoying the Christmas season, George and Martha find out what has happened on the news as Dennis explains to the camera and Mr. Johnson is being airlifted to safety. Dennis gives a shoutout to George, which leaves him so flabbergasted that he mutters to the viewers, "He's a menace!".

Cast
 Justin Cooper as Dennis Mitchell, a young boy who is a total disaster.  
 Don Rickles as George Wilson, the Mitchells' grumpy elderly next door neighbor and Martha's husband who strongly dislikes Dennis.
 Betty White as Martha Wilson, George's wife who thinks of Dennis as a surrogate grandson.
 George Kennedy as Mr. Johnson, Dennis' maternal grandfather, Alice's father, and Henry's father-in law who moves in with the Mitchells.
 Brian Doyle-Murray as the Professor, a con artist.
 Scott "Carrot Top" Thompson as Sylvester, the Professor's assistant.
 Dwier Brown as Henry Mitchell, Dennis’ father
 Heidi Swedberg as Alice Johnson Mitchell, Dennis' mother
 Keith Reece as Gunther, a friend of Dennis
 Jacqueline Steiger as Margaret Wade
 Danny Turner as Joey, Dennis' best friend
 Alexa PenaVega as Gina, a friend of Dennis
 Brooke Candy as the little girl on the diving board

External links

 
 
 

1998 direct-to-video films
1998 films
Direct-to-video sequel films
Dennis the Menace (U.S. comics) films
Warner Bros. direct-to-video films
1990s English-language films
Films based on comic strips
1998 comedy films
American comedy films
Films directed by Charles T. Kanganis
Direct-to-video comedy films
Films scored by Graeme Revell
Films with screenplays by Tim McCanlies
1990s American films